"Busy Doin' Nothin'" is a song by Swedish singer Ace Wilder. The track was written and composed by Ace Wilder, Joy Deb, Linnéa Deb. It premiered on 15 February 2014, as part of the third semi-final in Melodifestivalen 2014. The song successfully progressed to the final. The single was officially released on 23 February 2014, part of the EP with the same title.

Wilder performed "Busy Doin' Nothin'" on 8 March in Friends Arena in Stockholm for the final of Melodifestivalen. The song won the jury vote and came second in the televote, ultimately losing the contest by two points to Sanna Nielsen and her song "Undo".

Despite this, the song became popular in Sweden outpeaking "Undo" reaching the top in Swedish Charts selling 120,000 copies to date. "Undo" peaked at number 2 and has sold over 40,000 copies.

Charts and certifications

Weekly charts

Year-end charts

Certifications

References

Melodifestivalen songs of 2014
2014 singles
Number-one singles in Sweden
2014 songs
English-language Swedish songs
Songs written by Ace Wilder
Songs written by Joy Deb
Songs written by Linnea Deb
Warner Music Group singles
Ace Wilder songs